Mark A. Kahrs (born May 19, 1962) is an American politician who served in the Kansas House of Representatives as a Republican from 2013 to 2016. Kahrs was initially elected in November of 2012, taking 62% of the vote in an easy victory over Democrat Chris Florquist. He was re-elected in 2014, and declined to run for re-election in 2016.

References

Living people
1962 births
Republican Party members of the Kansas House of Representatives
21st-century American politicians
Politicians from Wichita, Kansas